Ninaivil Nindraval is a 1967 Indian Tamil-language romantic comedy film directed by Muktha Srinivasan. The film stars Ravichandran and K. R. Vijaya, with Nagesh, Cho, V. S. Raghavan, Anandan, Kumari Sachu, Manorama and Devaki in supporting roles. It revolves around a woman who, following her marriage, suffers amnesia, forgetting the events of her marriage.

The screenplay of Ninaivil Nindraval was written by Cho from a story by Rajasri. The film was produced by V. Ramasamy, photographed by T. N. Sundarababu and edited by L. Balu, with the music composed by V. Kumar. It was released on 1 September 1967, and emerged a success.

Plot 

Prema stays at her paternal uncle Doctor Sammandham's house for her higher studies. Both move to Chennai. Prema has a bike accident and suffers amnesia, losing her memories. Then she moves to a new city, where she meets an unemployed young man Prakash, and his friend Balu, protects her. Prema and Prakash fall in love and get married. She is then in another accident and loses the memories of her marriage. Prema's father Umapathi engages his General Manager Mohan. Balu moves to Chennai for his job, where he meets Prema and sends a message for his friend Prakash. Prakash reaches Bangalore and tries to prove Prema is his wife, but fails. Finally, Prema falls down into steps and recollects all her memories, her identity and her husband. Balu and his lover Meera get married.

Cast 
Male cast
 Ravichandran as Prakash
 Nagesh as Balu
 Cho as Doctor Sammandham
 V. S. Raghavan as Umapathi
 Anandan as Mohan

Female cast
 K. R. Vijaya as Prema/Radha
 Kumari Sachu as Meera
 Manorama as Sarala
 Devaki as Typist Kala

Soundtrack 
Music was by V. Kumar and lyrics were written by Vaali and C. N. Muthu.

Release and reception 
Ninaivil Nindraval was released on 1 September 1967, and distributed by Balaji. Kalki said all the film's flaws were compensated by its comedy. Though the film did not run for over 100 days in theatres, it was still a success.

References

Bibliography

External links 
 

1960s Tamil-language films
1967 films
1967 romantic comedy films
Films about amnesia
Films directed by Muktha Srinivasan
Films scored by V. Kumar
Films set in Bangalore
Films set in Chennai
Films shot in Tiruchirappalli
Indian black-and-white films
Indian romantic comedy films